Nicholas E. Weglarz (born December 16, 1987) is a Canadian former professional baseball outfielder.

Career
He attended Lakeshore Catholic High School in Port Colborne, Ontario. Weglarz was selected in the 2005 Major League Baseball draft in the third round (94th overall pick) as a first baseman by the Indians, and signed by Indians scout Les Pajari. Weglarz played mostly in the outfield for the Indians' affiliate the Burlington Indians.

Nick was also a part of Team Canada's baseball team in the 2008 Olympics in Beijing, where he hit .400 in the preliminaries, and .450 in the Olympic qualifier against Taiwan.

References

External links

Baseball America
Nick Weglarz' Olympic Page

1987 births
Living people
Akron Aeros players
Baseball outfielders
Baseball people from Ontario
Baseball players at the 2008 Summer Olympics
Burlington Indians players (1986–2006)
Canadian expatriate baseball players in the United States
Columbus Clippers players
Gulf Coast Indians players
Kinston Indians players
Lake County Captains players
Mississippi Braves players
Olympic baseball players of Canada
People from Port Colborne
World Baseball Classic players of Canada
2009 World Baseball Classic players
Leones del Caracas players
Canadian expatriate baseball players in Venezuela
Peoria Saguaros players